Prostřední Bečva is a municipality and village in Vsetín District in the Zlín Region of the Czech Republic. It has about 1,800 inhabitants.

Geography

The southern part of the municipality with the village is located in the Rožnov Depression lowlands. The northern part is located in the Moravian-Silesian Beskids.

History

Prostřední Bečva was founded in 1703.

Sights
Pustevny mountain saddle is famous for Libušín and Maměnka mountain cottages. These Art Nouveau folk buildings were built by Dušan Jurkovič in 1898 and are protected as national cultural monuments. A wooden belfry in Pustevny was also designed by Jurkovič.

References

External links

Villages in Vsetín District
Moravian Wallachia